Evi Lanig (born 24 October 1933) is a German former alpine skier. She competed in two events at the 1952 Winter Olympics. Lanig was also the German downhill champion in 1953, 1954 and 1955, and she was also the apline and giant slalom national champion.

References

External links
 

1933 births
Living people
German female alpine skiers
Olympic alpine skiers of Germany
Alpine skiers at the 1952 Winter Olympics
People from Oberallgäu
Sportspeople from Swabia (Bavaria)
20th-century German women